The 2009–10 Premier Academy League Under–18 season is the thirteenth edition since the establishment of The Premier Academy League, and the sixth under the current make-up.

All teams played the other teams in their group twice and play 10 inter-group fixtures, producing 28 games a season. Eight of the inter-group games were played against teams in their 'paired group' (i.e. A–B and C–D are the paired groups), whilst the remaining two games comprise one game against a team in each of the two remaining groups. Winners of each group qualify for play-offs.

Arsenal U18s defeated Nottingham Forest U18s 5–3 in the play-off final at the Emirates Stadium and won the title for the second season in a row.

League tables

Academy Group A 

Reference - final table at arsenal.com

Academy Group B 

Reference - table minus one fixture at official site, Tottenham results for final fixture

Academy Group C 

Reference - table minus one fixture at official site, Wolves results for final fixture

Academy Group D 

Reference - official table

Rules for classification: 1st points; 2nd goal difference; 3rd goals scoredPos = Position; Pld = Matches played; W = Matches won; D = Matches drawn; L = Matches lost; GD = Goal difference; Pts = PointsQ = Qualified for playoffs; C = Champions

Play-off semi-finals

Play-off Final

References

External links 
 Fixture and Results on official website

2009-10 Premier Academy League
Acad
Academy